Trichearias is a genus of moths belonging to the family Tineidae. It contains only one species, Trichearias nigella, which is found in Ecuador.

The wingspan is about 17 mm.

References

Tineidae
Monotypic moth genera
Moths of South America
Tineidae genera